Björn Ottersten (born 1961) is a Swedish educator, researcher, and electrical engineer who is the co-inventor of Space/Spatial Division Multiple Access (SDMA) technology.  He has made contributions in array signal processing and wireless communications and has received many notable awards in these areas. Currently, he is a Professor of Signal Processing at Royal Institute of Technology (KTH), Stockholm, Sweden, and the founding director of the Interdisciplinary Centre for Security, Reliability and Trust, at University of Luxembourg, Luxembourg. He is a Fellow of the IEEE and EURASIP.

From 2012, he has been an advisor to the European Commission, serving as the European Digital Champion of Luxembourg. He also serves as a Board Member of the Swedish Research Council, as well as the Editor-in-Chief of the EURASIP Signal Processing journal.

Biography 
He received the M.S. degree in electrical engineering and applied physics from Linköping University, Linköping, Sweden, in 1986. In 1989, he received the Ph.D. degree in electrical engineering from Stanford University, Stanford, CA. His advisor at Stanford was Thomas Kailath.

References

External links
Björn Ottersten

1961 births
Academic staff of the KTH Royal Institute of Technology
Swedish scientists
Swedish electrical engineers
Swedish writers
Living people